Tetsuji Hayashi (林哲司, Hayashi Tetsuji; born on August 20, 1949) is a Japanese composer, singer-songwriter, and arranger. Hayashi got his start after he was influenced by American pop music when he was kid. He started to compose and arrange for artists like Yukie Nakama, Momoko Kikuchi, Kiyotaka Sugiyama, and others during his career. He is credited for bringing the golden age of 80's J-Pop.

Biography 
Hayashi was born as the youngest of five siblings, growing up listening to American pop music from an early age under the influence of his brother. By the time he was 20, he entered the Yamaha Music School, which was sponsored by the Yamaha music magazine Light Music, which he would then go on to edit. After that, he began his activities as a composer and arranger, becoming his main activity in the 1980s. He composed song such as Anri's "Kanashimi ga Tomaranai," Akina Nakamori's "Kita Uingu," and Tomoyo Harada "Aijō Monogatari." He wrote songs such as Momoko Kikuchi's "Sotsugyō (Graduation)", Kiyotaka Sugiyama & Omega Tribe's "Futari no Natsu Monogatari", and Naoko Kawai's "Debyū/Manhattan Joke." He also became widely active as a music director and producer of film and drama soundtracks and events, singing for the film Hachikō Monogatari in 1987.

He opened Fuji Community FM 84.4HZ, a community FM radio station that covers Fuji, Fujinomiya, and Shibakawa, and became the representative of the company. He was also broadcasting the music program room844, and in 2003, he was the general producer of the ceremony for Wakafuji National Athletic Meet, and composed and arranged all the songs at the ceremony.

From October 2005 from to March 2010, he participated as a judge in the Nippon TV program Uta Suta!! where he appeared in the segment "Utaibito Hantā." Since 2007, he has appeared in the NHK program Kyō wa Tsuitachi Sakura Sakura SAKURA! In May, Hayashi's first composition and arrangement for playing Japanese musical instruments, Hōgaku Gassō-kyoku Kumanokodō, was released on CD. On October 23, 2008, he held a concert to commemorate the 35th anniversary of his activities at the Tokyo International Forum. In addition to guests such as Kiyotaka Sugiyama, Masaki Ueda and Junichi Inagaki, Mariya Takeuchi was invited as a secret guest who was hidden until the concert. Two songs written by Hayashi for Takeuchi, "September" and "Kōtoji Bowāru" were sung by the audience and surprised the musicians. In 2011, the song "The Suruga-Bay (Hahanaru umi e)" was provided at the Suruga Bay booth at the Numazu Deep Sea Aquarium and Coelacanth Museum.

Discography

Studio albums

References 

Omega Tribe (Japanese band) members
1949 births
Living people